The Americas Zone was one of three zones of regional competition in the 1995 Fed Cup.

Group I
Venue: Caracos Sports Club, Caracas, Venezuela (outdoor hard)
Date: 11–15 April

The eight teams were divided into two pools of four teams. The top two teams of each pool play-off in a two-round knockout stage to decide which nation progresses to World Group II play-offs. Nations finishing in the bottom place in each pool were relegated to Americas Zone Group II for 1996.

Pools

Knockout stage

  advanced to World Group II Play-offs.
  and  relegated to Group II in 1996.

Group II
Venue: Trinidad C.C., Maraval, Port of Spain, Trinidad and Tobago (outdoor hard)
Date: 27–30 March

The twelve teams were divided into four pools of three. The top team from each pool then moved on to the play-off stage of the competition. The two teams that won one match from the play-off stage would advance to Group I for 1996.

Pools

Play-offs

  and  promoted to Americas Group I in 1996.

See also
Fed Cup structure

References

 Fed Cup Profile, Mexico
 Fed Cup Profile, Colombia
 Fed Cup Profile, Venezuela
 Fed Cup Profile, Paraguay
 Fed Cup Profile, Brazil
 Fed Cup Profile, Chile
 Fed Cup Profile, Uruguay
 Fed Cup Profile, El Salvador
 Fed Cup Profile, Ecuador
 Fed Cup Profile, Costa Rica
 Fed Cup Profile, Bolivia
 Fed Cup Profile, Jamaica
 Fed Cup Profile, Puerto Rica
 Fed Cup Profile, Trinidad and Tobago

External links
 Fed Cup website

 
Sport in Caracas
Tennis tournaments in Venezuela
Sport in Port of Spain
Tennis tournaments in Trinidad and Tobago
20th century in Port of Spain